Tasos Stasinos (born 19 August 1985) is a Greek footballer, who plays as a right back. Stasinos has started his professional career with Vyzas before he earns his transfer to Elpidoforos Kifisias in 2009. Stasinos remained a player for the team even after they merged with A.O. Kifisia to create A.E. Kifisia. In the season 2013/14 he was voted the best right back of Football League 2. After that he joined Ethnikos Piraeus for free.

References
Tasos Stasinos
Ethnikos Piraeus players

1985 births
Living people
Vyzas F.C. players
A.E. Kifisia F.C. players
Ethnikos Piraeus F.C. players
Association football fullbacks
Footballers from Athens
Greek footballers